Sir John Dackombe (1 January 1570 – 29 January 1618) was a Member of Parliament and Chancellor of the Duchy of Lancaster.

He was born the eldest son of Richard Dackombe of Motcombe, Dorset and educated at the Middle Temple (1596). He succeeded his father in 1600 and was knighted in 1616.

He held a number of public offices, including those of Master of Requests (1613–16) and Chancellor of the Duchy of Lancaster (1616–18) and was the Member of Parliament for Corfe Castle in the 1614 Addled Parliament.

He married by 1607 Melior, the daughter of John Pitt, mercer, of Blandford Forum, Dorset and the widow of Robert Mohun of Bothenhampton, Dorset. They had 1 son and 2 daughters.

References

External links
 Sir John Dackombe notes from 1570-1618 Part 1 hosted at www.btinternet.com/~surrey.hypno/Genealog

1570 births
1618 deaths
members of the Middle Temple
Chancellors of the Duchy of Lancaster
Knights Bachelor
English MPs 1614